The 1957 Ivy League football season was the second season of college football play for the Ivy League and was part of the 1957 NCAA University Division football season. The season began on September 28, 1957, and ended on November 28, 1957. Ivy League teams were 7–6 against non-conference opponents and Princeton won the conference championship.

Season overview

Schedule

Week 1

Week 2

Week 3

Week 4

Week 5

Week 6

Week 7

Week 8

Week 9

1958 NFL Draft

One Ivy League player was drafted in the 1958 NFL draft, held in December 1957 and January 1958: Gil Robertshaw.

References